The Jiangwan Stadium, formerly Shanghai Stadium, is a multi-purpose athletics stadium in Shanghai.

History

Jiangwan Stadium was built in 1934 as part of the Greater Shanghai Plan. It hosted its first National Games of China in 1935.

During World War II the stadium was damaged by the Japanese during the Battle of Shanghai.

The Kuomintang government repaired the stadium for the Seventh National Games in 1948. This would be the last National Games before the People's Republic of China was established in 1949.

It hosted the National Games of China for the last time in 1983 when 8,943 athletes took part in 26 sports.

Australian rules football
On 17 October 2010, the stadium hosted a post season exhibition Australian Football League (AFL) match between the Melbourne Demons and the Brisbane Lions.

On 14 May 2017, the stadium hosted its first AFL regular season match for premiership points when  played the Gold Coast Suns during the 2017 AFL season. This was the first AFL premiership match to be played outside of Oceania. Port Adelaide won the match by a score of 16.14 (110) to 4.14 (38), in front of an official attendance of 10,118.

On 24 October 2017, it was announced that the AFL playing surface at the stadium will now be known as Adelaide Arena, and that AFL would be returning to the stadium in 2018.

On 25 October 2018, it was announced that St Kilda would play Port Adelaide for the following three seasons in Shanghai. No game was played in 2020 due to the COVID-19 pandemic; the match was later rescheduled to be played at Marvel Stadium in Melbourne, but was eventually scrapped following the suspension of the season on 22 March.

No match was scheduled for the 2021 AFL season, due to the ongoing impact of the COVID-19 pandemic. Instead,  played  at Cazaly's Stadium in Cairns, Queensland. Another Game was played at Cazaly's Stadium in 2022 to replace the Shanghai Game.

Australian Football League matches

Architecture

The stadiums architecture style is Chinese Art Deco, with the stadium itself designed by Dong Dayou, responsible for many landmarks in Shanghai built as part of the Greater Shanghai Plan implementation during the 1930s.

Transportation
The sport center is accessible from Jiangwan Stadium Station of Shanghai Metro.

See also
 Sport in China

References

External links
Official website 
Article on stadium renovation in 2006

Football venues in China
Sports venues in Shanghai
1934 establishments in China